"Alabama Jubilee" is a song written with music by George L. Cobb and words by Jack Yellen. The first known recording was that of comedians Collins & Harlan in 1915. The song is considered an American popular standard. The most popular versions of the song were Red Foley's 1951 version (#3 country, #28 pop) and the 1955 instrumental version by the Ferko String Band, which reached #13 on Cashbox, #14 on the Billboard Jukebox chart, and #20 in the UK. A 1981 instrumental version by Roy Clark won the Grammy Award for Best Country Instrumental Performance.

The song is a popular marching band song. It was remade as a Tejano song "El circo" by Tony De La Rosa.

Other versions

1916: Prince Band
1926: Skillet Lickers
1927: Al Bernard & Ernest Hare
1929: Cleve Chaffin
1929: The McClung Brothers
1950: Muggsy Spanier
1951: The Fontane Sisters
1951: Johnny Maddox
1951: Hank Penny
1954: Chet Atkins
1955: David Carroll And His Orchestra
1955: Firehouse Five Plus Two
1956: The Dukes of Dixieland
1959: Ferlin Husky
1959: Teresa Brewer and the Dixieland Band
1962: Billy Vaughn
1962: Los Broncos De Reynosa (El Circo)
1964: Mance Lipscomb
1964: Roy Clark
1968: Doc Watson

1970: Jerry Reed
1971: Kenny Price
1976: Benny Martin
1976: R. Crumb & His Cheap Suit Serenaders
1978: Leon Redbone
1980: Jerry Lee Lewis
1980: Clarence White (and The Kentucky Colonels) (live performances from 1973)
1988: Nokie Edwards
1988: David Grier
1999: 17 Hippies
2002: Buster B. Jones
2005: Orquestra Mahatma
2007: Molly and Jack Tuttle
2008: Eugene Chadbourne
2008: Kevin Blechdom
2010: Zac Brown Band
2012: Stephen Wade
2015: Jim Hendricks
2018: Roland White

External links
"Alabama jubilee", New York: Remick Music Corp., 1915. From Alabama Sheet Music Collection

References

1916 songs
Songs written by Jack Yellen
Red Foley songs
Roy Clark songs
Chet Atkins songs
Ferlin Husky songs
Teresa Brewer songs
Doc Watson songs
Jerry Reed songs
Kenny Price songs
Jerry Lee Lewis songs
Songs about Alabama
Songs with music by George L. Cobb